Gennady, also spelled Gennadi or Gennadiy, is a Russian male name. They are derived from the Greek given name Gennadius.

People
Gennady Gladkov, Soviet and Russian composer
Gennady Golovkin, Kazakh boxer
Gennady Gudkov, Russian politician and businessman
Gennadi Karponosov, Soviet and Russian Olympic and world champion ice dancer and coach
Gennady Korotkevich, Belarusian sport programmer
Gennady Logofet, Soviet and Russian footballer and football coach
Gennady Semenovich Makanin, Russian mathematician
Gennady Mikhasevich, prolific Soviet serial killer and rapist
Gennady of Novgorod, Russian archbishop
Gennady Padalka, Russian cosmonaut
Gennady Rozhdestvensky, Soviet and Russian conductor
Gennadi Syomin, Russian footballer and football coach
Genndy Tartakovsky, Russian-American cartoonist
Gennady Yanayev, the only vice president of the Soviet Union
Gennady Zyuganov, Russian political party leader and assemblyman
Giennadij Jerszow, Polish and Ukrainian sculptor

Russian masculine given names